Antioch Christian Church is a historic church located at 4805 NE Antioch Road in Kansas City, Missouri.  It was built in 1859, and is a one-story, frame building sheathed in clapboard siding.  It has a front gable roof and measures approximately 33 feet wide and 51 feet, 6 inches, deep.  It was moved to its present location in 1968.

It was listed on the National Register of Historic Places in 1979.

References

Churches in Missouri
Churches on the National Register of Historic Places in Missouri
Churches completed in 1859
Buildings and structures in Clay County, Missouri
National Register of Historic Places in Kansas City, Missouri